Crennan is a surname. Notable people with the surname include:

 George Crennan (1900–2001), Australian cleric
 Susan Crennan (born 1945), Australian judge
 John Crennan (1880–1924), Australian rules footballer